Zhang Li (Chinese: 张力; born 6 August 1989) is a Chinese footballer who currently plays as a midfielder for Changchun Yatai in the Chinese Super League.

Club career
In 2009, Zhang Li started his professional footballer career with Henan Jianye in the Chinese Super League. He eventually made his league debut for Henan on 21 May 2011 in a game against Dalian Shide. In February 2015, he was loaned to China League One club Wuhan Zall until 31 December 2015. He was sent to the reserved team in 2016.

In February 2017, Zhang moved to fellow Super League side Changchun Yatai. He would go on to make his debut for the club in a league game against Guangzhou R&F F.C. on 12 March 2017, which ended in a 1-0 defeat. On 4 August 2018 in a league game against Shanghai Shenhua, Zhang was accused of racially abusing opposing player Demba Ba. An investigation by the Chinese Football Association saw Zhang officially guilty of causing chaos, however no reference to racial abuse was mentioned. He was handed a six match ban and a fine of 42,000 yuan (US$6,100) on 10 August 2018.

Career statistics
Statistics accurate as of match played 31 December 2022.

Honours

Club
Henan Jianye
China League One: 2013
Changchun Yatai
 China League One: 2020

References

External links
 

1989 births
Living people
Sportspeople from Luoyang
Footballers from Henan
Henan Songshan Longmen F.C. players
Wuhan F.C. players
Beijing Guoan F.C. players
Changchun Yatai F.C. players
Chinese Super League players
China League One players
Association football midfielders
Chinese footballers